Ingo Peirits (born 20 July 1963) is an Austrian modern pentathlete. He competed at the 1984 Summer Olympics, finishing in 51st place out of 52 competitors in the individual event.

References

1963 births
Living people
Austrian male modern pentathletes
Olympic modern pentathletes of Austria
Modern pentathletes at the 1984 Summer Olympics